Delia Domínguez Mohr (11 August 1931 – 7 November 2022) was a Chilean poet, a member of her country's literary Generation of '50.

Biography
A descendant of German settlers, Delia Domínguez lost her mother when she was five years old; Amalia Mohr died of tuberculosis in 1936. Her father, Luis Domínguez, a lawyer and judge, sent her and her brother Luis to boarding school. Delia studied at the Osorno School of German Nuns.

About her time as a schoolgirl, Domínguez remembered that she felt "very lonely, so much that I talked with dogs and horses."

She studied law at the University of Chile, but in her third year she abandoned this and dedicated herself to managing the family farm, Santa Amelia de Tacamó in Osorno. During her student days she suffered her second great tragedy (after the death of her mother): at age 20 she lost the love of her life. Delia recalled:

Domínguez has contributed to several publications, particularly  magazine, of which she was editor-in-chief and a literary critic. She has also been a host of some television art programs on Channel 9 of the University of Chile, and a panelist on the  program Carretera Cultural.

As a member of the Academia Chilena de la Lengua, she occupied its 4th chair on 25 May 1992. Her incorporation speech was titled Señales de una Poesía Mestiza en el Paralelo 40° Sur.

After her father died in 1970, she lived in the same house in the Santiago neighborhood of Providencia.

Her poems have been translated into several languages, particularly German and English. She has been nominated for the National Prize for Literature four times.

Pablo Neruda, her friend, said of her:
On 7 November 2022, Domínguez died at the age of 91.

Awards and distinctions
 1966 Pedro de Oña Municipal Award
 Illustrious daughter of the city of Osorno, 1992
 1996 National Book Council Award
 1999 Felipe Herrera Lane Foundation Award
 2001 Universidad Mayor Award
 Finalist for the 2001 Altazor Award for Poetry for Huevos revueltos
 2005 Pablo Neruda Order of Artistic and Cultural Merit

Works
 Simbólico retorno, 1955
 La tierra nace al canto, 1958
 Obertura siglo XX, 1961
 Parlamentos del hombre claro, 1963
 Contracanto, 1968
 El sol mira para atrás, 1973
 Pido que vuelva mi ángel, 1982
 La gallina castellana y otros huevos, 1995
 Huevos revueltos, 2000
 Clavo de olor, 2004
 El sol mira para atrás. Antología personal de poesía y prosa, Catalonia, 2008; incorporates poems from other books
 Paralelo 40 Sur, anthology, with poems and unpublished stories, 2012

References

External links
 "¿De dónde viene Delia Domínguez?" by Oreste Plath

1931 births
2022 deaths
20th-century Chilean poets
20th-century Chilean women writers
21st-century Chilean poets
21st-century Chilean women writers
Chilean people of German descent
Chilean women poets
Members of the Chilean Academy of Language
People from Osorno, Chile